Joshua Gilmore (born July 6, 1944), better known as Joey, is an American electric blues and soul blues singer, songwriter, and guitarist.  He has shared the stage with James Brown, Etta James, Bobby Bland, Little Milton, and Little Johnny Taylor among others. Gilmore's best known tracks include "Blues All Over You".

Life and career
Gilmore was born in Ocala, Florida, United States.
Self-taught on the guitar at an early age, from watching a local minister-cum-barber playing his own flat-bodied guitar, Gilmore initially headed a band of youths who appeared in local clubs long before they were legally able to enter such establishments.

In the 1960s, Gilmore relocated to South Florida, and he became a popular local attraction which led to him accompanying many touring blues, R&B and soul musicians. He recorded a small number of tracks in the 1970s, including his debut single "Somebody Done Took My Baby And Gone" / "Do It To Me One More Time" (1971). He released several EPs at that time, as well as the Joey Gilmore album (1977), which was re-released in 2012. His next album was So Good to be Bad (1989), released by Pandisc Records. The album reached number 80 on the US Billboard R&B album chart. It took until the mid 1990s before Gilmore began recording more frequently, and he appeared at numerous blues, jazz and soul festivals which included dates in Fort Lauderdale, Hollywood, Mississippi Valley, Montreux, Riverwalk, and in Taiwan. In 2012 he played at the Daytona Blues Festival.

In 2006, Gilmore and his backing band took part in the Blues Foundation's International Blues Challenge in Memphis, Tennessee, where he won the 'Best Band' section.

Amongst Gilmore’s sidemen in the mid-2000s were Regi Oliver (saxophone/keyboard), George Caldwell (bass) and Dave Wooten (drums).

In 2008, Gilmore was awarded a Blewzzy Award for the 'best song', "Blues All Over You". In the same year he released Bluesman, on Emancipation Media, and appeared at the Poconos Blues Festival. In 2009, Gilmore performed at the Taichung Jazz Festival, and the Briggs Farm Blues Festival. In 2013, Gilmore undertook various functions backed by the Sean Carney Band.

In 2015, Gilmore was honored with a Latin World Talent Lifetime Achievement Award. He continues to regularly play throughout his native Florida, including an appearance at the Pompano Beach Seafood Festival, and beyond. His latest album, Brandon's Blues, was self-released by Gilmore in 2015.

Discography

Albums

References

External links
Discography at Discogs.com
2006 interview ~ Barrelhouseblues.com

1944 births
Living people
20th-century American male singers
20th-century American singers
21st-century American male singers
21st-century American singers
American blues singer-songwriters
American blues guitarists
American male guitarists
Electric blues musicians
Soul-blues musicians
Singer-songwriters from Florida
Musicians from Ocala, Florida
20th-century American guitarists
21st-century American guitarists
Guitarists from Florida
American male singer-songwriters